Tiberia paumotensis is a species of minute sea snail, a marine gastropod mollusk in the family Pyramidellidae, the pyrams and their allies.

Description
The thin, smooth, white shell is hyaline. Its length measures 10 mm. The upper whorls suddenly taper to an acute apex. The base of the shell is slightly produced. The teleoconch contains nine convex whorls. The suture is margined. The columella is slightly callous, with two oblique plaits, the lower one most conspicuous, the upper smaller and deep-seated.

Distribution
The type species has been found in the Pacific Ocean off the Tuamotus.

References

External links
 To World Register of Marine Species

Pyramidellidae
Gastropods described in 1886